The Fulcrum is the English language student newspaper at the University of Ottawa. The paper dates back to 1942 and co-exists on the bilingual campus with La Rotonde, the University of Ottawa's French newspaper. The two newspapers are not simply translated copies of the same material, rather, the two are completely separate—and sometimes rivalling—entities.

The newspaper covers news, arts and culture, and sports information relevant to University of Ottawa students and nearby community, and contains a feature article each week. It is published weekly during the school year and less regularly during exam and break periods.

The Fulcrum is a member of the Canadian University Press (CUP), and recently hosted NASH 70 (the 70th annual Canadian University Press National Conference) in January, 2008. At NASH 71, held in Saskatoon during January 2009, the Fulcrum officially became the sister paper of the Muse at Memorial University. At NASH 76, held in Edmonton during January 2014, the Fulcrum won the bid to host NASH 77, titled "ACCESS," in January, 2015.

The Fulcrum was awarded the Student Publication of the Year in 2019 at NASH 81 hosted by The Gauntlet Publications Society at the University of Calgary.

The Fulcrum debuts

In 1942, The University of Ottawa's English Debating Society published the inaugural edition of their newsletter, entitled The Fulcrum. The newsletter was supervised by Rev. Lorenzo Danis, OMI, and its first editor-in-chief was John Beahen. The premiere edition included as its mission statement the following: "The Fulcrum is dedicated entirely to the interests of our students of today and yesterday."

In its first year, The Fulcrum was funded almost entirely by alumni donations and published only 8 issues per year. Due to its conservative Catholic editorial policies, The Fulcrum was fairly non-controversial compared to its more outspoken counterpart, La Rotonde. The inclusion of advertising starting in its second year allowed the paper some slight financial freedom and The Fulcrum continued in this manner until 1946, when it came under the supervision of the English Students' Association and the SFUO. In 1947, The Fulcrum became a member of the Canadian University Press, a national cooperative linking student newspapers across Canada.

In the 50s and 60s

In 1951, the SFUO (suffering from serious financial problems) proposed that The Fulcrum and La Rotonde be combined into one publication and renamed The Ottawa. The proposal was rejected, but operations at the two papers were condensed into one workspace in the house the SFUO occupied at the time.

Throughout the 1950s, La Rotonde and the University of Ottawa administration had a combative relationship, inciting the Canadian University Press to label La Rotonde as "the most censored student newspaper in Canada" in 1956. The ill-will between the two groups reached a climax in 1958, when three editors from La Rotonde were expelled for an article criticizing Queen Elizabeth II. La Rotonde ceased publishing after this and was not re-formed again until January 1959. Despite the atmosphere on campus, The Fulcrum continued to publish during this time.

Both The Fulcrum and La Rotonde continued to publish unabated throughout most of the 1960s, with La Rotonde continuing with its outspoken approach, and The Fulcrum often playing the mediator and aiming criticism at both parties. However, this began to change in 1964, when the University of Ottawa administration censored an article in La Rotonde espousing the opinion that Queen Elizabeth II was not welcome in Quebec. The Fulcrum spoke out on the issue and in an editorial at the time stated that: "We feel that the administration should have given the publishers of La Rotonde a chance to act. The publishers (the Students' Union) are the ones who should have the right to confiscate an issue of a student newspaper, or any part thereof". Following from this, The Fulcrum became a more outspoken voice on campus.

In 1969, both publications were canceled and replaced with a bilingual monthly entitled Id, directed by Ian Green. The official reason for the cancellation of The Fulcrum and La Rotonde and the subsequent launch of Id was a lack of student interest in both newspapers; however, it was during this time that Canada was enveloped in the polarizing events of the October crisis, and many attribute the climate on campus and cancellation of the opposing-language newspapers to these events.

In the 70s, 80s, and 90s

In 1970, both newspapers were re-instated and continued to publish regularly as services of the Student Federation of the University of Ottawa (which incorporated in 1969). The next three decades were quieter and both newspapers were able to achieve a stability on campus, buoyed by the receipt of a guaranteed student levy voted on in a referendum by U of O students.

The relationship between the university administration and both newspapers gradually became more distant during this time, and (as the publisher of both papers) the SFUO began to step in to moderate and control content when the SFUO felt it was needed. However, the ability of the SFUO to pull any content they deemed questionable quickly lead to dissent on the part of both newspapers and questions of censorship arose. The SFUO stepped in several times during these decades to censor issues that were objectionable or could have been construed as libel, much to the chagrin of editors at both papers. Fueled by their lack of control over their publication and an increasing move towards autonomy in student newspapers across the country, editors at The Fulcrum began formulating plans to go "autonomous" as early as 1998, but many stalled attempts meant that they were not successful until many years later.

It was during this time that The Fulcrum moved to offices located between University of Ottawa's Thompson Residence and Morriset Library (later occupied by CHUO-FM, and now known as the Déjà Vu lounge). In 1989, The Fulcrum was relocated to the basement of 631 King Edward Ave. across from the main campus in a University of Ottawa building.

In the 21st century

In 1999, after several years of a rocky relationship with the Ottawa Gaming Club (who occupied the first floor of 631 King Edward Ave.) The Fulcrum was granted the first and second floor of the building as their new offices. It was also in 1999 that "The Fulcrum" began to make more use of digital technology, switching from more traditional layout techniques to computer layout, and switching over to digital photography, beginning with digital contributions by Steven Meece.

Beginning in the 2003–2004 school year, the paper began referring to itself as University of Ottawa's Fulcrum, rather than The Fulcrum, on the cover.

In the summer of 2004, recently elected editor-in-chief Mary Cummins and managing editor Marcus McCann once again looked into plans to become an autonomously incorporated organization. This push was spurred on by the SFUO attempting to pull the Summer 2004 issue of the Fulcrum for featuring a mug of beer and using the term "Frosh" (the SFUO had recently stopped using the term frosh in favour of welcome week and later 101 week due to negative connotations associated with the term). Aside from this, the separation was due to several reasons. The main reason being that the editorial board felt it was an inherent conflict of interest to be owned by the student government while attempting to write fair, unbiased, and often critical stories about them. The secondary reason was that as an autonomous corporation, the Fulcrum was able to directly control its own finances and spur further growth of the paper.

After discussing the situation with then-president of the SFUO Philippe Laliberté, plans were made to begin the process. In October 2004, a letters patent was granted to "The Fulcrum Publishing Society", the corporation that would take over the governance of the Fulcrum, and negotiations between the SFUO and the Fulcrum continued throughout the year. After approval by the SFUO's Board of Administration, ownership of the Fulcrum officially transferred to The Fulcrum Publishing Society on June 1, 2005.

The Fulcrum Publishing society was set up to be governed by a ten-member board of directors made up of students, community members, Fulcrum staff, U of O faculty, and Fulcrum alumni. Ultimate responsibility for the governance and management of the corporation was left with the board while the president, who acted as the business manager, made decisions on a day-to-day basis. To avoid a similar conflict of interest, provisions were put into the corporate bylaws prohibiting the board from interfering in editorial content unless faced with possible legal action.

After a turbulent first year, the Fulcrum settled into a financially stable position as an autonomous corporation.

Recent changes to the governance structures of the Corporation have led to slight changes, such as the Business (now General) Manager no longer being permitted to hold a seat on the Board, and the roles of the corporation's executives being clarified.

In 2014–15, the newspaper received a complete visual redesign including a new layout and logo.

National defence ad boycott 

On March 19, 2008, the Fulcrum held its Annual General Meeting, normally a fairly subdued event. However, the 2008 AGM saw a group of students mobilize to try to create an ad boycott for the purpose of stopping recruitment ads for the Canadian Forces being run by the Department of National Defence, which those students found objectionable. The meeting was contentious, and the first vote, which came out against the boycott 73–69, was challenged and retaken. On the second vote, it passed by a vote of 93–85, binding the Fulcrum to cease accepting ads from the Department of National Defence as of May 1, 2008. Most of the Fulcrum's editorial board and staff members were against the boycott.

On February 6, 2009, the Fulcrum held its Annual General Meeting and the topic of boycott lists emerged again.  A motion was presented to remove the advertising boycott list and it was passed unanimously by a vote of 38–0.

Transition to online 
The Fulcrum transitioned to an online only news source for the 2019/2020 publication year. This completed the transition which saw the paper only publish one print paper a month for the 2018/2019 publication year.

University of Ottawa's 2020 debate on academic freedom 

On October 2, 2020, the Fulcrum published an article detailing the use of a racial slur by a University of Ottawa professor in an online classroom. The article and student outrage on social media led to the university temporarily suspending the professor sparking a nationwide debate on academic freedom at Canadian universities.

Editorial board

Board of directors/general manager/executive director

Current board of directors
President: Kalki Nagaratnam (Continuity Rep)
Vice-President: Brendan Keane (Staff Rep)
Secretary: Vacant
Chair: Samuel Coulavin (Community Rep)
Treasurer: Claire Liu (Community Rep)
Director: Mark Asfar (Community Rep)
Director: Keelan Buck (Staff Rep)
Director: Erik Chin (Student Rep)
Director: Emma Godmere (Fulcrum Alumna)
Director: Chaymaa Nadi (Student Rep)
Director: Amit Shanbhoug (Student Rep)
Ex-officio: Ludvica Boota (Executive Director)
Ex-officio: Jasmine McKnight (Co-Editor-in-Chief)
Ex-officio: Hailey Otten (Co-Editor-in-Chief)

Presidents

2021–Present: Kalki Nagaratnam
2019-2021: Justin Turcotte
2016-2019: Raghad Sheikh-Khalil
2015-2016: Mackenzie Gray
2014-2015: Keeton Wilcock
2013-2014: Kyle Hansford/Keeton Wilcock
2012-2013: Mercedes Mueller
2011-2012: Andrew Hawley
2010-2011: Scott Bedard
2009-2010: Nick Taylor-Vaisey
2008-2009: Ross Prusakowski
2006-2008: Rob Fishbook
2005-2006: Mary Cummins

Executive Directors/General Managers
 2021–Present: Ludvica Boota
 2021: Justin Turcotte
 2020-2021: Dorian Ghosn
 2020: Rame Abdulkader
 2018-2020: Dorian Ghosn
 2016–2018: Lucas Ghosn
 2015-2016: Dayne Moyer
 2012-2015: Andrew Hawley
 2011-2012: Danielle Vicha
 2010-2011: David McClelland
 2009-2010: Frank Appleyard
 2008-2009: Ross Prusakowski
 2006-2008: Rob Fishbook
 2005-2006: Mary Cummins

Notable alumni

 André Picard, Quebec Bureau Chief and health columnist for The Globe and Mail
 Douglas Roche, OC, former Chairman of the United Nations Disarmament Committee, Senator and Member of Parliament
 Kate Heartfield, author, former editorial pages editor for the Ottawa Citizen and professor of journalism at Carleton University
 Jason Chiu, Visual Editor The New York Times

See also
List of student newspapers in Canada
List of newspapers in Canada

References

External links

The Fulcrum on Twitter
The Fulcrum on YouTube

Newspapers published in Ottawa
University of Ottawa
Weekly newspapers published in Ontario
Newspapers established in 1942
1942 establishments in Ontario
Student newspapers published in Ontario